The Alfred River is a river in New Zealand's Tasman region. It runs west-southwest from its source in the Spenser Mountains to its junction with the Maruia River. The schist in the river contains hornblende. The area has a temperate oceanic climate. Gold is said to have been found in the area.

References 

Rivers of the Tasman District
Rivers of New Zealand